is a tennis video game developed by Bandai Namco Studios for the PlayStation Portable and Xbox 360. The game features world class tennis players such as Roger Federer, Rafael Nadal and Justine Henin. The Xbox 360 version of the game featured updated graphics and new gameplay elements such as the ability to choose player emotions. The Xbox 360 version was delayed in all regions until between late August and early September 2008.

Gameplay
The player roster consists of:
Andy Roddick
David Nalbandian
Rafael Nadal
Roger Federer
Justine Henin
Maria Sharapova
Martina Hingis
Serena Williams

Reception

The game received "mixed or average reviews" on both platforms according to the review aggregation website Metacritic. In Japan, Famitsu gave it a score of all four eights for the PSP version, and one seven, one eight, and two sevens for the Xbox 360 version.

See also
Smash Court Tennis Pro Tournament 
Smash Court Tennis Pro Tournament 2

References

External links
 
 
 

2007 video games
Namco games
Tennis video games
PlayStation Portable games
Video games developed in Japan
Xbox 360 games